Blind Mississippi Morris (born Morris Cummings; April 6, 1955 in Clarksdale, Mississippi, United States) is an American blues musician.

Life and career
Cummings became blind at the age of four, a victim of congenital glaucoma. Morris became a solo blues performer on Beale Street, and his current backing band is called the Pocket Rockets.

Morris comes from a musical background; his cousins, Robert and Mary Diggs, led the Memphis Sheiks, while his aunt, Mary Tanner, played with the Harps of Melody.  Morris is also a cousin of Willie Dixon.  He was named as one of the 10 best harmonica players in the world by Bluzharp magazine.

Discography

See also
List of blues musicians

References

External links
Blind Mississippi Morris – Icehouse Records
Blind Mississippi Morris – You Know I Like That CD

 Memphis Rock & Soul Museum
 Short bio/doc on Blind Mississippi Morris

1955 births
Living people
Musicians from Clarksdale, Mississippi
Blind musicians
American blues singers
American blues guitarists
American male guitarists
American blues harmonica players
Blues musicians from Mississippi
Guitarists from Mississippi
20th-century American guitarists
20th-century American male musicians